Koit, an Estonian word meaning "dawn", is used as an Estonian masculine given name. Notable people with the name include:

Koit Annamaa (1912–1970), Estonian track and field athlete
Koit Pikaro (born 1949), Estonian politician
Koit Toome (born 1979), Estonian singer

Estonian masculine given names